The Old Swan Band is a long-established and influential English country dance band.

Early years
Its origins lie in the early 1970s with the English country dance band Oak, one of a tiny handful at that time that combined melodeon with fiddles. Two members of Oak, husband and wife Rod and Danny Stradling (melodeon and vocals), went on to form The Cotswold Liberation Front, which became The Old Swan Band in 1974. They recruited fiddler Paul Burgess, percussionist Martin Brinsford and the Fraser Sisters (Fi and Jo). Fi (short for Fiona) is a fiddle player and singer; her sister Jo (aged 13 when she joined the band) plays saxophone, clarinet and whistles, and is also a singer and composer.

The new band took the English country dance scene by storm. Up to this point the English Folk Dance and Song Society had set the tone for polite decorum at Cecil Sharp House. With a drummer and sax player, The Old Swan Band brought punchiness to a very English repertoire of tunes (and occasional songs), drawn from recordings of traditional English country musicians such as Walter Bulwer, Scan Tester, the Copper family and Reg Hall.

Albums
The title of the Old Swan Band's first album, released in 1976, was their manifesto – "No Reels". This was a way of saying you would not find fancy reels and jigs or any frantically paced tunes here. In their wake came several other folk dance bands that combined brass instruments with fiddles - the New Victory Band, the Cock and Bull Band and Ramsbottom.

After two more albums Rod and Danny Stradling left the band. The band became fiddle-dominated and after recording an EP in 1983, did not return to the recording studio until 2004 – a gap of twenty-one years, during which time the band's members also worked on other projects and with other bands.

The 2004 album, Swan-Upmanship was, as before, decidedly non-Celtic – almost all the tunes were drawn from the English tradition. The line-up on this recording was John Adams (trombone, fiddle), Martin Brinsford (percussion), Paul Burgess (fiddle), Fi Fraser (fiddle), Jo Freya (tenor saxophone, whistle), Neil Gledhill (bass saxophone), Flos Headford (fiddle) and Heather Horsley (keyboard).

Other projects
Rod Stradling recorded with the English Country Blues Band, the English Country Dance Band, Tiger Moth and Edward II and the Red Hot Polkas. He became editor of Musical Traditions, a highly respected magazine whose archives are now available online .

The Fraser Sisters recorded as a duo. Jo Fraser changed her name to Jo Freya as a condition of joining the actors' union Equity, which does not allow two of its members to share the same name. Broadening her repertoire to embrace European influences, she joined Blowzabella and its spin-off Scarp; she also plays with Token Women (as do her sister Fi and Heather Horsley) and with her own pan-European group called Freyja.

Martin Brinsford went on to join Brass Monkey, with Martin Carthy.

Paul Burgess and Flos Headford were founder-members of the Mellstock Band.

Discography
No Reels - (1976) - Free Reed Records FRR 011
Old Swan Brand - (1978) - Free Reed Records FRR 028
Gamesters, Pickpockets and Harlots - (1981) - Dingle's, LP DIN 322 
The Old Swan Band - (1983) - Waterfront, WF EP 04, 7"ep with 5 tracks 
Still Swanning... After All These Years - Compilation album (1995) Free Reed Records, FREE-CD31
Swan-Upmanship - (2004) - WildGoose, WGS320CD
Swan For The Money - (2011) - WildGoose, WGS378CD
Fortyssimo - (2014) - WildGoose, WGS407CDFortyfived - (2019) - Wildgoose, WGS434CD

Anthologies This Label is not Removable - A Celebration of 25 years of Free Reed - (2001) - Free Reed Records, FRTCD 25Stepping Up: A History of the New Wave of English Country Dance Music - (2004) - TOPIC-CD752fRoots 24 - (2004) (fRoots'' magazine sampler)

References

English folk musical groups
Music in Gloucestershire